Molonou-Blé is a town in central Ivory Coast. It is a sub-prefecture of Didiévi Department in Bélier Region, Lacs District.

Molonou-Blé was a commune until March 2012, when it became one of 1126 communes nationwide that were abolished.

In 2014, the population of the sub-prefecture of Molonou-Blé was 23,348.

Villages
The 36 villages of the sub-prefecture of Molonou-Blé and their population in 2014 are:

References

Sub-prefectures of Bélier
Former communes of Ivory Coast